The 2001–02 season was Swindon Town's second season in the Division Two since their relegation from the second tier of English football in 2000. Alongside the league campaign, Swindon Town will also competed in the FA Cup, League Cup and the Football League Trophy.

Nationwide League Division Two

Brighton earned a second successive championship, despite the loss of manager Micky Adams early in the season - however, they would also have to cope with the loss of replacement manager Peter Taylor after the season ended. Reading earned the runners-up spot after four seasons in Division Two, and the play-offs were won by Stoke City who, despite this success, sacked manager Gudjon Thordarson immediately afterwards (leaving Reading in the odd position of being the only top six side to start the 2002–03 season with the same manager that they had at the start of the 2001–02 season).

QPR came out of administration at the end of a season where they finished a respectable eighth in their first campaign at this level since the 1960s, featuring in the race for a playoff place until the penultimate game of the season. Wigan Athletic finished a disappointing 10th after successive playoff appearances, but kept faith in manager Paul Jewell to deliver promotion in his second season at the helm. 

Cambridge United were cut adrift early in the season, and never looked to have much chance of surviving. Long-time Division Two members Wrexham never recovered from a bad start, and also went down. Bury suffered a financial crisis off the pitch and the effects of this ultimately affected the team's performance and sent them down to the League's bottom tier. The final relegation spot was filled by Bournemouth.

Leading goalscorer: Bobby Zamora (Brighton and Hove Albion) - 28

Results and matchday squads

Division Two line-ups 

1 1st Substitution, 2 2nd Substitution, 3 3rd Substitution.

FA Cup line-ups 

1 1st Substitution, 2 2nd Substitution, 3 3rd Substitution.

League Cup line-ups 

1 1st Substitution, 2 2nd Substitution, 3 3rd Substitution.

Football League Trophy line-ups 

1 1st Substitution, 2 2nd Substitution, 3 3rd Substitution.

References 

2001-02
Swindon Town